Macedonian conjugation is the creation of derived forms of a Macedonian verb from its principal parts by inflection.

Macedonian verbs are conventionally divided into three main conjugations according to the thematic vowel used in the citation form (i.e. }}):
 а–group (e.g. вика, бега);
 и–group — further divided into three subgroups according to the thematic vowel in the }}:
 и–subgroup (носи—носив, учи—учив),
 е–subgroup (остари—остарев, оздрави—оздравев),
 а–subgroup (стои—стојав, лежи—лежов).
 е–group — further divided into four subgroups according to the thematic vowel in the }}:
 а–subgroup (викне—викнав, падне—паднав),
 е–subgroup (умре—умрев, задре—задрев),
 о–subgroup (пече—пеков, сече—секов),
 ∅–subgroup (i.e. with an athematic stem; пие—пив, трие—трив).

Futurity is expressed by placing the invariable particle ќе before a verb phrase.

Synthetic series
The synthetic series consists of three simple tenses—the present, imperfect and aorist—and the imperative mood.

Present tense

1, 2 The syllabic thematic vowel и changes to the non-syllabic ј when preceding inflectional suffixes which begin with a vowel.

Past tenses

Imperfect

Aorist

а–group

и–group

3 An intrusive /j/ occurs between /i/ and /a/.

е–group

4 An intrusive /j/ occurs between /i/ and /a/.

Imperative mood

Non-finite series
The non-finite series consists of the verbal л-form, verbal adverb, verbal noun and verbal adjective.

 The verbal л-form occurs in two forms: one based on the imperfect stem and one based on the aorist stem. The verbal л-form inflects for gender and number.

 The verbal adverb is an invariant form, based on the imperfect stem with the addition of the suffix -јќи; ex. викајќи.
 The verbal noun is based on the imperfect stem of imperfective verbs with the addition of the suffix -ње; ex. одење. The verbal noun inflects for number and case as with other nouns.
 The verbal adjective is based on the aorist stem when the stem ends in /a/. Otherwise, the imperfect stem is used. It is formed by adding -/t/ to the end of the stem where the vowel is preceded by -/n/ or -/ɲ/, otherwise -/n/ is used; for example, покани 'to invite' has the verbal adjective поканет 'invited', and дојде 'to come' has the verbal adjective дојден 'arrived'. The verbal adjective inflects for number, gender and case as with other adjectives.

Analytic series
The analytic series consists of compound tenses and the conditional mood. It is further divided into the сум-series, беше-pluperfect series and има-series.

Сум-series
 The сум-aorist is formed using the present tense of сум (inflecting for person, and dropped in 3P sg. and 3P pl.) and the aorist verbal л-form.
 The сум-imperfect is formed using the present tense of сум (inflecting for person, and dropped in 3P sg. and 3P pl.) and the imperfect verbal л-form

Беше-pluperfect series
 The беше-aorist is formed using the aorist of сум (inflecting for person, and dropped in 3P sg. and 3P pl.) and the aorist verbal л-form.
 The беше-imperfect is formed using the imperfect of сум (inflecting for person, and dropped in 3P sg. and 3P pl.) and the imperfect verbal л-form.

Има-series
 The има-perfect is formed using the present tense of има (inflecting for person) and the neuter sg. verbal adjective.
 The имаше-pluperfect is formed using the imperfect of има (inflecting for person) and the neuter sg. verbal adjective.
 The имал-perfect is formed using the present tense of сум (inflecting for person, and dropped in 3P sg. and 3P pl.), the verbal л-form of има and the neuter sg. verbal adjective.

Conditional mood
The conditional mood is formed using the invariant particle би with the verbal л-form.  Imperfective and perfective verbs typically use the imperfect and aorist verbal л-forms, respectively.

Bibliography
 Koneski, B. (1996), Граматика на македонскиот јазик ['A Grammar of the Macedonian Language'] (Macedonian), Skopje: Prosvetno Delo Inc.
 Friedman, V. A. (2001), Macedonian, SEELRC: Duke University.
 Lunt, H. G. (1952), A Grammar of the Macedonian Literary Language, Skopje.
 Foulon–Hristova, J. and Poposki, A. (1998), Grammaire pratique du macédonien ['A Practical Grammar of Macedonian'] (French), Paris: Langues & mondes, l'Asiatthèque.

External links
 FlexiMac — an automatic conjugator for Macedonian verbs.
 Vigna.mk  — Macedonian aspectual conjugator.

Conjugation
Macedonian grammar
Indo-European verbs